Gretna may refer to:

Places

Australia 
Gretna, Tasmania

Canada 

Gretna, Manitoba

Scotland 
Gretna, Dumfries and Galloway
Gretna Green, Dumfries and Galloway

United States 
Gretna, Florida
Gretna, Kansas
Gretna, Louisiana
Gretna, Nebraska
Gretna, Ohio
Mount Gretna, Pennsylvania
Mount Gretna Narrow Gauge Railway
Mount Gretna Heights, Pennsylvania
Gretna, Virginia

Transportation
Gretna Green railway station, a railway station in Gretna Green, Dumfries and Galloway, Scotland
Gretna railway station (Border Union Railway), a former station
Gretna railway station (Caledonian Railway), a former station

Other uses
Gretna F.C., a now defunct Scottish football club
Gretna F.C. 2008, a Scottish football club founded by the fans of the above
Gretna (skipper), a genus of butterflies in the grass skipper family

See also